Charles-Avila Wilson (10 December 1869 – 7 April 1936) was a Canadian lawyer, politician, and judge.

Born in Île Bizard, Quebec, Canada, Wilson was a lawyer by profession. He was elected to the House of Commons of Canada for the electoral district of Laval in the 1908 federal election. A Liberal, he was re-elected in the 1911 federal election. He was later appointed a judge.

Electoral record

References
 

1869 births
1936 deaths
Liberal Party of Canada MPs
Members of the House of Commons of Canada from Quebec
People from L'Île-Bizard–Sainte-Geneviève